The Galway Football Association is the governing body for association football in County Galway. It is responsible for organizing and managing the Galway & District League, Eamonn Deacy Park, and Galway W.F.C.

Affiliated leagues
 Galway & District League
 Galway FA Ladies Senior League

Cup competitions
 Galway Cup
 Michael Byrne Cup

See also
 Irish Universities Football Union
 Munster Football Association
 Leinster Football Association
 Women's Football Association of Ireland

References

 
Association football governing bodies in the Republic of Ireland